Oyam District is a district in Northern Uganda. Like most Ugandan districts, it is named after its 'chief town', Oyam, where the district headquarters are located.

Location

Oyam District is bordered by Gulu District to the north, Pader District to the northeast, Kole District to the east, Apac District to the south, Kiryandongo District to the southwest and Nwoya District to the west. The coordinates of the district are: 02 14N, 32 23E.

Overview
Oyam District was established by the Ugandan Parliament in 2006. Prior to that, Oyam District was part of Apac District. Together with Lira District, Alebtong District, Amolatar District, Apac District, Dokolo District, Kole District, Otuke District, Oyam District is part of the larger Lango sub-region, home to an estimated 1.5 million Langi. The district is a predominantly rural district.

Population
In 1991, the national population census estimated the district population at about 177,100. The 2002 national census estimated the population of the district at about 268,400. The district population was growing at an annual rate of 3.5%, at that time. It was estimated that the population of the district in 2012 was approximately 378,900.

Economic activities
Subsistence agriculture and animal husbandry are main economic activities in the district. The major crops grown include:

Livestock kept in the district includes:

See also

References

External links
 Growing Old In Oyam, Uganda: Mary Joyce’s Story

 
Lango sub-region
Districts of Uganda
Northern Region, Uganda